National Commission may refer to:

 National Commission for Denotified, Nomadic and Semi-Nomadic Tribes
 National Commission for the Development of Indigenous Peoples
 National Commission on the Disappearance of Persons
 National Commission on Libraries and Information Science
 National Commission on Marihuana and Drug Abuse
 National Commission for Minorities
 National Commission on Population
 National Commission for the Protection of Human Subjects of Biomedical and Behavioral Research
 National Commission on Resources for Youth
 National Commission on the BP Deepwater Horizon Oil Spill and Offshore Drilling
 National Commission on Terrorist Attacks
 National Commission for Women

See also